Guardian Angel is a 2001 South Korean television drama series starring Song Hye-kyo and Kim Min-jong. It aired on SBS from August 1 to September 20, 2001 on Wednesdays and Thursdays at 21:55 for 16 episodes.

Synopsis 
When her pregnant friend gives birth then dies after a vehicular accident, Jung Da-so (Song Hye-kyo) raises the child as her own. Da-so was an orphan, so she endures the stigma of being an unwed mother in order for her daughter to have a family.

Ha Tae-woong (Kim Min-jong), who was raised by his uncle after his mother died, has never met his father. Da-so and Tae-woong meet as employees of Woori Company, whose president is Tae-woong's father. Through a twist of fate, their lives become entwined with Kang Sae-hyun (Yoon Da-hoon) and Ho Ji-soo (Kim Min), and Da-so sees both the best and worst in human nature.

Cast
 Song Hye-kyo as Jung Da-so
 Kim Min-jong as Ha Tae-woong
 Kim Min as Ho Ji-soo
 Yoon Da-hoon as Kang Sae-hyun
 Jang Hang-sun as Ha Deok-ho, Tae-woong's uncle
 Kim Bo-sung as Soon-dong, Tae-woong's friend 
 Lee Soon-jae as Kang Doo-shik, Tae-woong's father
 Jung Eo-jin as Da-so's adoptive daughter
 Choi Jae-won as Mr. Na, Da-so's co-worker
 Kim Seung-wook 
 Kim Hyung-bum 
 Lee Mi-young
 Eun Seo-woo
 Park Joo-mi 
 Seo Bum-yul
 Lee Do-ryun  
 Lee Hee-do 
 Jo Mi-ryung as Yeo Eun-joo
 Song Geum-shik

International broadcast
In the Philippines, it was aired on GMA Network in 2005.

References

External links
 Guardian Angel official SBS website  
 

Seoul Broadcasting System television dramas
2001 South Korean television series debuts
2001 South Korean television series endings
Korean-language television shows
South Korean romance television series